Saint-Bernard-de-Lacolle is a municipality in Les Jardins-de-Napierville Regional County Municipality, Quebec, Canada, located in the administrative area of Montérégie. Saint-Bernard-de-Lacolle was established as a municipality officially in 1855, and its population as of the Canada 2016 Census was 1,549. A major border crossing, Blackpool, is located where St-Bernard-de-Lacolle abuts the village of Champlain, New York, at the junction of Quebec Autoroute 15 and U.S. Interstate 87.

Demographics

Population

Language
Where English is a spoken fluently in the region, the municipality recognizes French as an official language for formal and informal use.

Education

The South Shore Protestant Regional School Board previously served a portion of the municipality.

References

External links
Saint-Bernard-de-Lacolle Regional Parc

Municipalities in Quebec
Incorporated places in Les Jardins-de-Napierville Regional County Municipality